Reddyanus loebli is a species of scorpion in the family Buthidae.

Description
Total length 26–45 mm. Male has longer metasomal segments and telson than female. Pedipalps and legs are yellow with several small brown spots. Body yellowish with black spots. Pedipalp, femur and patella are spotted, where patella mostly black, and femur mostly yellow. Subaculear tooth is pointed. There are 14 to 17 pectinal teeth. Hemispermatophore with a median lobe terminating distally in a pointed cusp. There is a pointed subaculear tooth in juveniles. Male is characterized by a markedly enlarged terminal tubercle of the dorsal carina on the second metasomal segment, which is absent in females and juveniles.

References

Animals described in 1982
loebli